Sean Kenneth Choat (born 2 February 1970) is an Australian Liberal National politician who was the member of the Legislative Assembly of Queensland for Ipswich West from 2012 to 2015.

Choat contested the 2006 and 2009 state elections for the Liberal Party of Australia (QLD) and the LNP respectively, previous to his election in 2012.

Choat announced he would cross the floor and go against his party on the issue of asset sales.

He was elected as a councillor on the Somerset Regional Council in 2016 and re-elected in 2020.

References

Liberal National Party of Queensland politicians
1970 births
Living people
Members of the Queensland Legislative Assembly
21st-century Australian politicians